Dobratice is a municipality and village in Frýdek-Místek District in the Moravian-Silesian Region of the Czech Republic. It has about 1,300 inhabitants.

Etymology
The name is derived from the personal name Dobrata, who was probably the founded of the village. In 1749, the name of the village was written as Dobrachtitz.

Geography
Dobratice lies in the historical region of Cieszyn Silesia, in the Moravian-Silesian Foothills. The Lučina River flows through the municipality.

History

Dobratice was probably founded around 1512. It belonged then to the Duchy of Teschen. The first written mention of Dobratice is from 1580, when it was owned by the Tluk of Tošanovice family.

After Revolutions of 1848 in the Austrian Empire a modern municipal division was introduced in the re-established Austrian Silesia. Dobratice as a municipality was subscribed to the political and legal district of Cieszyn. According to the censuses conducted in 1880–1910 the population of the municipality grew from 908 in 1880 to 954 in 1910 with a majority being native Czech-speakers (at least 82.8% in 1910, at most 95% in 1890), followed by Polish-speaking minority (at least 5% in 1890, at most 15.8% in 1910) and German-speaking people (at most 1.1% in 1880) and in 1910 there were also 1.3% people speaking another languages. In terms of religion in 1910 majority were Roman Catholics (89.7%), followed by Protestants (8.9%).

In 1865 the Church of Saints Philip and James was consecrated, which led to a separation from Horní Domaslavice parish in 1868. In 1888, the railway was opened.

After World War I, Polish–Czechoslovak War and the division of Cieszyn Silesia in 1920, it became a part of Czechoslovakia. Following the Munich Agreement, in October 1938 together with the Zaolzie region it was annexed by Poland, administratively adjoined to Cieszyn County of Silesian Voivodeship. It was then annexed by Nazi Germany at the beginning of World War II. After the war it was restored to Czechoslovakia.

Sights
The landmark of Dobratice is the Church of Saints Philip and James. It was built in 1863–1865. The tower was raised in 1894 and a pyramid was placed on it.

Twin towns – sister cities

Dobratice is twinned with:
 Zábiedovo, Slovakia

References

External links

 

Villages in Frýdek-Místek District
Cieszyn Silesia